Ben Berl Zyskowicz (born 24 May 1954) is a Finnish politician and member of parliament. Zyskowicz was chairman of the Finnish National Coalition Party's (Finnish: Kansallinen Kokoomus) parliamentary group from 1993 to 2006, and has been a member of parliament for the National Coalition Party since 1979. He was the first Jew to be elected to the Finnish parliament. Following the parliamentary elections in April 2011, Zyskowicz was elected as the speaker of the parliament for the duration of negotiations over the governing coalition.

Early life

Zyskowicz was born in Helsinki as the son of a Polish Jewish father, Abram, who had been in the Sachsenhausen and Majdanek concentration camps and moved as a refugee to Sweden, where he met Ben's mother, Ester, a Finnish Jew.

Abram and Ester Zyskowicz's first child Carmela was born in 1952, and the family moved to Finland the following year. Ben Zyskowicz was born in the following year. Abram Zyskowicz drowned on a swimming trip when Ben was six years old.

Carmela and Ben had Polish citizenship until 1959 when they were naturalized as Finnish citizens. The Zyskowicz family spoke Swedish at home, and Ben spoke Finnish at the Jewish school he attended.

Personal life

Ben Zyskowicz has been married to Rahime Husnetdin-Zyskowicz, a member of the Finnish Tatar community, since 1982 and has two daughters, Daniela (1983) and Dinah (1985). He also abstains from alcohol and was known to be a regular at Café Strindberg which is a popular celebrity-spotting location on Pohjoisesplanadi in the Helsinki city centre.

Career
Zyskowicz is renowned for being the Finnish politician with the most difficult name to spell. In 2002, Ilta-Sanomat reported that only 16.6% of Finns knew how to correctly spell his name. In 2011, he was elected as the acting speaker of the Finnish parliament. Despite spelling instructions for his name being sent by text message to elected members of parliament, two voting ballots were disqualified for misspelling his name.

Zyskowicz has stated that he has not tried to reach minister positions due to his chronic migraine. In 2020, he said he has also started to suffer of depression. As adolescent he had taken psychotherapy in order to cope with anxiousness and panic attacks.

References

External links

1954 births
Living people
Politicians from Helsinki
Finnish Jews
Finnish people of Polish-Jewish descent
Jewish politicians
National Coalition Party politicians
Speakers of the Parliament of Finland
Members of the Parliament of Finland (1979–83)
Members of the Parliament of Finland (1983–87)
Members of the Parliament of Finland (1987–91)
Members of the Parliament of Finland (1991–95)
Members of the Parliament of Finland (1995–99)
Members of the Parliament of Finland (1999–2003)
Members of the Parliament of Finland (2003–07)
Members of the Parliament of Finland (2007–11)
Members of the Parliament of Finland (2011–15)
Members of the Parliament of Finland (2015–19)
Members of the Parliament of Finland (2019–23)
Recipients of the Order of the Cross of Terra Mariana, 3rd Class
Naturalized citizens of Finland